Matrak is an Ottoman combat sport based on sword and shield fighting, Invented by the Ottoman Bosnian statesman, historian and scientist Nasuh Matrakčija Visočak (full name in Turkish: Nasuh bin Karagöz bin Abdullah el-Bosnavî) in the 16th century. It is played with wooden sticks covered with leather simulating a sword, and a wooden leather covered shield. The top of the sticks are rounded and slightly wider than the body resembling bowling pins. The game is a kind of combat simulation, and is played on a lawn. It was used by Ottoman soldiers as practice for melee combat.

In the television series Muhteşem Yüzyıl, it is shown as a combat-game.

References

External links
Türkiye Geleneksel Spor Dalları Federasyonu "Matrak" 

Turkish games
Lawn games
Games of physical skill
Combat sports
Sport in the Ottoman Empire